The azimuthal quantum number is a quantum number for an atomic orbital that determines its orbital angular momentum and describes the shape of the orbital.  The azimuthal quantum number is the second of a set of quantum numbers that describe the unique quantum state of an electron (the others being the principal quantum number, the magnetic quantum number, and the spin quantum number).  It is also known as the orbital angular momentum quantum number, orbital quantum number, subsidary quantum number, or second quantum number, and is symbolized as ℓ (pronounced ell).

Derivation 
Connected with the energy states of the atom's electrons are four quantum numbers: n, ℓ, mℓ, and ms. These specify the complete, unique quantum state of a single electron in an atom, and make up its wavefunction or orbital. When solving to obtain the wave function, the Schrödinger equation reduces to three equations that lead to the first three quantum numbers. Therefore, the equations for the first three quantum numbers are all interrelated. The azimuthal quantum number arose in the solution of the polar part of the wave equation as shown below , reliant on the spherical coordinate system, which generally works best with models having some glimpse of spherical symmetry.

An atomic electron's angular momentum, L, is related to its quantum number ℓ by the following equation:

The quantum number ℓ is always a non-negative integer: 0, 1, 2, 3, etc. L has no real meaning except in its use as the angular momentum operator. When referring to angular momentum, it is better to simply use the quantum number ℓ.

Atomic orbitals have distinctive shapes denoted by letters. In the illustration, the letters s, p, and d (a convention originating in spectroscopy) describe the shape of the atomic orbital.

Their wavefunctions take the form of spherical harmonics, and so are described by Legendre polynomials. The various orbitals relating to different values of ℓ are sometimes called sub-shells, and are referred to by lowercase Latin letters (chosen for historical reasons), as follows:

Each of the different angular momentum states can take 2(2ℓ + 1) electrons. This is because the third quantum number mℓ (which can be thought of loosely as the quantized projection of the angular momentum vector on the z-axis) runs from −ℓ to ℓ in integer units, and so there are 2ℓ + 1 possible states. Each distinct n, ℓ, mℓ orbital can be occupied by two electrons with opposing spins (given by the quantum number ms = ±), giving 2(2ℓ + 1) electrons overall. Orbitals with higher ℓ than given in the table are perfectly permissible, but these values cover all atoms so far discovered.

A simplistic one-electron model results in energy levels depending on the principal number alone. In more complex atoms these energy levels split for all , placing states of higher ℓ above states of lower ℓ. For example, the energy of 2p is higher than of 2s, 3d occurs higher than 3p, which in turn is above 3s, etc. This effect eventually forms the block structure of the periodic table. No known atom possesses an electron having ℓ higher than three (f) in its ground state.

The angular momentum quantum number, ℓ, governs the number of planar nodes going through the nucleus. A planar node can be described in an electromagnetic wave as the midpoint between crest and trough, which has zero magnitudes. In an s orbital, no nodes go through the nucleus, therefore the corresponding azimuthal quantum number ℓ takes the value of 0. In a p orbital, one node traverses the nucleus and therefore ℓ has the value of 1.  has the value .

Depending on the value of n, there is an angular momentum quantum number ℓ and the following series. The wavelengths listed are for a hydrogen atom: 
 , Lyman series (ultraviolet)
 , Balmer series (visible)
 , Ritz–Paschen series (near infrared)
 , Brackett series (short-wavelength infrared)
 , Pfund series (mid-wavelength infrared).

Addition of quantized angular momenta 

Total angular momentum of an electron in the atom 

Due to the spin–orbit interaction in the atom, the orbital angular momentum no longer commutes with the Hamiltonian, nor does the spin. These therefore change over time. However the total angular momentum J does commute with the one-electron Hamiltonian and so is constant. J is defined through

L being the orbital angular momentum and S the spin. The total angular momentum satisfies the same commutation relations as orbital angular momentum, namely

from which follows

where Ji stand for Jx, Jy, and Jz.

The quantum numbers describing the system, which are constant over time, are now j and mj, defined through the action of J on the wavefunction 

So that j is related to the norm of the total angular momentum and mj to its projection along a specified axis. The j number has a particular importance for relativistic quantum chemistry, often featuring in subscript in electron configuration of superheavy elements.

As with any angular momentum in quantum mechanics, the projection of J along other axes cannot be co-defined with Jz, because they do not commute.

Relation between new and old quantum numbers 

j and mj, together with the parity of the quantum state, replace the three quantum numbers ℓ, mℓ and ms (the projection of the spin along the specified axis). The former quantum numbers can be related to the latter.

Furthermore, the eigenvectors of j, s, mj and parity, which are also eigenvectors of the Hamiltonian, are linear combinations of the eigenvectors of ℓ, s, mℓ and ms.

List of angular momentum quantum numbers 
 Intrinsic (or spin) angular momentum quantum number, or simply spin quantum number
 orbital angular momentum quantum number (the subject of this article)
 magnetic quantum number, related to the orbital momentum quantum number
 total angular momentum quantum number

History 
The azimuthal quantum number was carried over from the Bohr model of the atom, and was posited by Arnold Sommerfeld. The Bohr model was derived from spectroscopic analysis of the atom in combination with the Rutherford atomic model.  The lowest quantum level was found to have an angular momentum of zero.  Orbits with zero angular momentum were considered as oscillating charges in one dimension and so described as "pendulum" orbits, but were not found in nature. In three-dimensions the orbits become spherical without any nodes crossing the nucleus, similar (in the lowest-energy state) to a skipping rope that oscillates in one large circle.

See also 
 Angular momentum operator
 Introduction to quantum mechanics
 Particle in a spherically symmetric potential
 Angular momentum coupling
 Clebsch–Gordan coefficients

References

External links

 Development of the Bohr atom
 Detailed explanation of the Orbital Quantum Number l
 The azimuthal equation explained

Angular momentum
Atomic physics
Quantum numbers
Rotational symmetry

de:Nebenquantenzahl